This is a list of the breeds of goat usually considered to originate in Spain and Portugal.

 Algarvia
 Azpi Gorri
 Bermeya
 Blanca Celtibérica
 Blanca Serrana Andaluza
 Blanca de Rasquera
 Bravia
 Cabra Galega
 Cabra de las Mesetas
 Charnequeira
 Del Guadarrama
 Eivissenca
 Florida
 Jurdana
 Majorera
 Malagueña
 Mallorquina
 Moncaína
 Murciano-Granadina
 Negra Serrana
 Palmera
 Payoya
 Pirenaica
 Pitiüsa
 Preta de Montesinho
 Retinta
 Serpentina
 Serrana
 Tinerfeña
 Verata

References

 
Goat
 
Goat